Chersomorpha hyphantria is a species of moth of the family Tortricidae. It is found in Papua New Guinea and on Sumba, an island in eastern Indonesia.

References

Moths described in 1984
Phricanthini